Frequency is a 2000 American science fiction thriller drama film starring Dennis Quaid, Jim Caviezel, Andre Braugher, Elizabeth Mitchell, Shawn Doyle, Melissa Errico and Noah Emmerich.

Directed by Gregory Hoblit and written by Toby Emmerich, it was distributed by New Line Cinema. It also features Michael Cera in his feature film debut.

The film received positive reviews and grossed $68.1 million worldwide, against a budget of $31 million.

Plot
In 1969 New York, a gasoline tanker overturns on a highway ramp, spilling fuel into an electrical substation below ground and trapping two workers. Among the responding firefighters is veteran Frank Sullivan, who goes underground to rescue the workers against the direction of his commander, and despite the rising level of fuel and the sparking created by damaged electrics. Frank and another firefighter pull the workers out and escape just before a spark ignites a huge explosion, and Frank returns safely home to his wife Julia and young son Johnny.

In 1999, John Sullivan is an NYPD detective still living in his childhood home. His girlfriend Samantha leaves him because she believes he is emotionally shut off, the result of his father Frank dying in a fire when John was six years old. John's lifelong friend and neighbor, Gordo, stops by with his young son and finds a Heathkit single-sideband ham radio that once belonged to Frank, but fails to get it working.

The night before the anniversary of his father's death, John is surprised to find the radio operating during a particularly intense occurrence of the aurora borealis, and has a brief conversation with another man concerning the 1969 World Series, which John is able to recount in specific detail. He realizes from this and other details that he is communicating with his father on the same date in 1969, and warns him of the mistake that led to his death. Frank is alarmed and refuses to believe it, but the next day, while rescuing a runaway from a burning warehouse, he recalls John's warning and survives the fire.

In 1999, John is struck with new memories of his father surviving until 1989. He and Frank reconnect, and they share details of their lives. Frank decides to quit smoking, believing John's warning that he will eventually die of lung cancer.

John discovers that his present has been changed in other unexpected ways. He and Frank have inadvertently prevented the death of the "Nightingale", a serial killer who originally murdered three nurses in the 1960s and was never caught. He has now killed ten women, including John's own mother Julia. To save her and the other future victims, John enlists Frank's help in stopping the Nightingale before he can kill again.

Following information from John about the killings, Frank saves the first victim, but before he can rescue the second, the Nightingale subdues him, steals his driver's license, and plants it on the victim to frame Frank for the murder.

When Frank relates his experience, John realizes Frank's wallet has the Nightingale's fingerprints. John asks his father to hide the wallet somewhere in the house where John can find it 30 years later. Using the preserved fingerprints from the wallet, John identifies the Nightingale as Jack Shepard, a former NYPD detective.

In 1969, Frank's close friend (and John's future boss) detective Satch DeLeon arrests Frank on suspicion of murder; he resists, and the radio is knocked over and damaged. At the station, Frank attempts to prove his innocence to Satch by accurately predicting the course of the 1969 World Series, including the Game 5 shoe polish play. Frank escapes from the police station and breaks into Shepard's apartment, where he finds trophies from the murders. Shepard arrives and attacks Frank, who fends him off and, apparently, kills him after a foot chase. Satch, having realized that Frank was telling the truth, arrives at Shepard's apartment and finds the victims' jewelry, exonerating Frank.

Frank returns home and repairs the radio.  While talking over the radio, Frank and John are each attacked by the 1969 and 1999 versions of Shepard. Frank blows off Shepard's hand with a shotgun and he flees. In 1999, as John fights off Shepard, the house changes rapidly around them. An elderly Frank appears and kills Shepard with the same shotgun. He and John tearfully embrace.

The film concludes with a softball game including John and his own little son, Samantha (now his wife and expecting a baby), Frank, Julia, Satch, and Gordo, who has become wealthy thanks to a stock tip fed to him in the past by John.

Cast

 Dennis Quaid as Frank Sullivan, a firefighter,  John's Father and Julia's husband
 Jim Caviezel as John Francis Sullivan, a detective and son of Frank and Julia
 Daniel Henson as 6-year-old Johnny Sullivan
 Andre Braugher as Satch DeLeon
 Elizabeth Mitchell as Julia Sullivan, a nurse, John's mother and Frank's wife
 Shawn Doyle as Jack Shepard
 Rocco Sisto as Darryl Simpson
 Noah Emmerich as Gordo Hersch, John's best friend
 Stephen Joffe as 6-year-old Gordo Hersch
 Melissa Errico as Samantha Thomas, John's ex-girlfriend
 Jordan Bridges as Graham Gibson
 Peter MacNeill as Butch Foster
 Michael Cera as Gordy Hersch, Gordo's son
 Marin Hinkle as Sissy Clark
 Prof. Brian Greene as himself

Production
The film was greenlighted for production on January 21, 1999. Sylvester Stallone was rumored to be taking the role of Frank Sullivan in 1997, but fell out of the deal after a dispute over his fee. Renny Harlin was rumored to be director on the film. Gregory Hoblit first read the script in November 1997, eighteen months after his father's death. In a 2000 interview shortly after the American release of Frequency, he described the film as "high risk" since the project had already been passed among several directors, including one of note who had twice the budget Hoblit was given. In the same interview, he described the difficulty he had finding the two leads. Hoblit realized he needed an "experienced actor" to portray Frank Sullivan and thus chose Dennis Quaid.

Release
Two weeks before its release, a sneak preview of the film was shown in Final Destination.

Home media
Frequency was released on DVD on October 31, 2000 and on VHS on April 3, 2001. It was later released on Blu-ray on July 10, 2012 by Warner Home Video.

Reception

Box office
Frequency was released at 2,631 theaters, making $9 million during its opening weekend. Eventually, the film grossed $45 million domestically and $23.1 million in other territories, for a worldwide gross of $68,106,245.

Critical response
Frequency received generally positive reviews. Based on 127 reviews collected by the film review aggregator Rotten Tomatoes, the film has a 70% approval rating with an average rating of 6.5/10. The consensus reads, "A tight blend of surprises and suspense keeps audiences spellbound." On Metacritic — which assigns a weighted mean score — the film has a score of 67 out of 100 based on 32 critics, indicating "generally favorable reviews". Audiences polled by CinemaScore gave the film an average score of "A-" on an A+ to F scale.

Roger Ebert called the film's plot "contrived", yet gave the film a favorable review. He also pointed out similarities with the films The Sixth Sense and Ghost. David Armstrong, of the San Francisco Chronicle, praised the moments in the film when John and Frank Sullivan talked to each other over the ham radio but criticized the "unintentionally funny climax." He also praised actor Shawn Doyle's performance as the Nightingale killer, calling him  "convincingly creepy." Todd McCarthy of Variety magazine said despite Dennis Quaid and James Caviezel's physical separation in the film, they formed a "palpable bond that [gave] the picture its tensile strength". McCarthy noted that screenwriter Toby Emmerich's "bold leap into reconfiguring the past" created "agreeable surprises" and an "infinite number of possibilities" to the plot's direction. He added, however, that the serial killer subplot was "desperately familiar". 
James Berardinelli gave the film two stars out of four, criticizing the "coincidence-laden climax" but wrote that "poor writing [did] not demand subpar acting", praising Frequency's "few nice performances".

The American Radio Relay League assisted in some of the technical aspects in the film, though some ham radio enthusiasts criticized technical errors that made it into the film.

Frequency was nominated for the Hugo Award for Best Dramatic Presentation, but ultimately lost out to Crouching Tiger, Hidden Dragon. The film's ending song, "When You Come Back to Me Again", was nominated for a Golden Globe Award. Written by Jenny Yates and Garth Brooks (performed only by Brooks), the song failed to win, losing out to "Things Have Changed" from Wonder Boys.

Television adaptations

In November 2014, it was reported that Supernatural showrunner Jeremy Carver was in talks to produce a new television series adaptation/reboot based on the film for television network NBC. The film's writer Toby Emmerich is attached to serve as a producer for the series. NBC passed on it, and a pilot was ordered at The CW in January 2016. The series was canceled after one season on May 8, 2017.

A South Korean adaptation of Frequency, Signal, aired on tvN from January 22 to March 12, 2016, with a sequel series currently in development. A Japanese remake of Signal starring Kentaro Sakaguchi aired from April 10 to June 12, 2018 on Fuji TV, while a Chinese remake of Signal, titled Unknown Number, started airing on Tencent Video on October 23, 2019.

While not a television adaptation, Frequency was briefly parodied in the television show Reno 911, where the Reno officers respond to a house fire and are urged by the homeowner to "save his novel," which turns out to mirror the plot of Frequency. The Reno officers proceed to spoil the ending of the "novel" (based on them having seen the movie), causing the homeowner to suddenly become ambivalent about having his novel saved from the flames.

See also
 List of films featuring time loops
 Ditto (2000 film)

References

External links
 
 
 

2000 films
2000s science fiction thriller films
Alternate timeline films
American science fiction thriller films
Fictional portrayals of the New York City Police Department
Films about the New York City Police Department
Films scored by Michael Kamen
Films adapted into television shows
Films directed by Gregory Hoblit
Films set in 1969
New Line Cinema films
Films set in 1999
Films set in New York City
Films shot in New York City
Films shot in Toronto
Films about firefighting
New York Mets
American police detective films
American serial killer films
American supernatural thriller films
Time loop films
Films about time travel
Films about nurses
Films set in Queens, New York
Films about father–son relationships
2000s English-language films
2000s American films